is a compilation of various Darius titles. It was released in Japan for the Nintendo Switch on February 28, 2019, and on PlayStation 4 on March 5, 2020. A worldwide release on both platforms followed on June 16, 2020. The Arcade arc of the collection was released in 2021 on Steam.

Editions 
There are six editions of Darius Cozmic Collection:
Japanese releases
 Standard Edition (released physically and digitally for Switch, and digitally on PlayStation 4 under the title Arcade Edition)
 Consumer Edition (released digitally for Switch and PlayStation 4)
 Special Edition (released physically for Switch, combining both of the above on one cartridge)

International releases
 Arcade Edition (released physically and digitally for PlayStation 4 and Switch, released digitally for PC through Steam)
 Console Edition (released physically and digitally for PlayStation 4 and Switch)
 International Edition (released physically for PlayStation 4 and Switch as a combination of the Arcade and Console Editions (separate CDs/ cartridges) with additional goodies)

Sequel 
A sequel, Darius Cozmic Revelation, was released physically for PlayStation 4 and Nintendo Switch on February 25, 2021, in Japan, containing the games G-Darius HD (also including the standard resolution version) and Dariusburst: Another Chronicle EX+. These games were also released separately on their respective digital storefronts worldwide and separate physical editions were released internationally. A 2022 update added G-Darius Ver. 2, G-Darius Ver. 2 HD and G-Darius for Consumer (the Japanese PlayStation port) to the compilation. This update was also added to the separate editions of G-Darius HD. A standalone port of G-Darius HD was released to Steam in 2022.

Editions 
Japanese releases
 Both games are available separately in digital form
 Regular Edition contains both games on one disc/cartridge
 Limited Edition contains the Regular Edition and further goodies.
International releases
 Both games are available separately in digital form
 Both games are available separately as physical game releases
 another Limited Edition was released by Strictly Limited Games with both games on one disc/cartridge and further goodies.
 The Switch release of this contains the Game Boy version of Sagaia as a bonus on the cartridge.

Overview 
Almost all of the editions feature different games.

Notes

References

External links
Darius Cozmic Collection Official Website

2019 video games
Darius (series)
Nintendo Switch games
PlayStation 4 games
Single-player video games
Horizontally scrolling shooters
Taito games
Square Enix video game compilations
Windows games
Video games developed in Japan